John Douglas (1 February 1774 – 31 July 1838) was an English Tory politician. He was the son of Thomas Douglas of Grantham, a wealthy landowner, and Harriot Lucke.

He was a Member of Parliament (MP) for Orford 1818 - April 1821 and for Minehead 12 April 1822 - 1826.

To escape his creditors, Douglas, a Turf enthusiast, went to Sweden where his brother-in-law, Benjamin Bloomfield, 1st Baron Bloomfield, was envoy, remaining there to 1835.

References

External links 
 

1774 births
1838 deaths
Members of the Parliament of the United Kingdom for English constituencies
UK MPs 1818–1820
UK MPs 1820–1826
Tory MPs (pre-1834)